The 1955 Chicago White Sox season was the team's 55th season in the major leagues, and its 56th season overall. They finished with a record of 91–63, good enough for third place in the American League, 5 games behind the first place New York Yankees.

Offseason 
 December 6, 1954: Leo Cristante, Ferris Fain, and Jack Phillips were traded by the White Sox to the Detroit Tigers for Walt Dropo, Ted Gray and Bob Nieman.
 December 6, 1954: Don Ferrarese, Don Johnson, Matt Batts, and Fred Marsh were traded by the White Sox to the Baltimore Orioles for Bob Chakales, Jim Brideweser and Clint Courtney.
 February 10, 1955: Lloyd Merriman was purchased by the White Sox from the Cincinnati Redlegs.
 Prior to 1955 season (exact date unknown)
 Vito Valentinetti was acquired from the White Sox by the Charleston Senators.
 Jim McAnany was signed as an amateur free agent by the White Sox.

Regular season

Season standings

Record vs. opponents

Opening Day lineup 
 Chico Carrasquel, SS
 Nellie Fox, 2B
 Minnie Miñoso, LF
 George Kell, 3B
 Jim Rivera, CF
 Walt Dropo, 1B
 Willard Marshall, RF
 Sherm Lollar, C
 Virgil Trucks, P

Notable transactions 
 April 16, 1955: Lloyd Merriman was purchased by the Chicago Cubs from the Chicago White Sox.
 June 7, 1955: Bob Chakales, Clint Courtney and Johnny Groth were traded by the White Sox to the Washington Senators for Jim Busby.

Roster

Player stats

Batting 
Note: G = Games played; AB = At bats; R = Runs scored; H = Hits; 2B = Doubles; 3B = Triples; HR = Home runs; RBI = Runs batted in; BB = Base on balls; SO = Strikeouts; AVG = Batting average; SB = Stolen bases

Pitching 
Note: W = Wins; L = Losses; ERA = Earned run average; G = Games pitched; GS = Games started; SV = Saves; IP = Innings pitched; H = Hits allowed; R = Runs allowed; ER = Earned runs allowed; HR = Home runs allowed; BB = Walks allowed; K = Strikeouts

Farm system

Notes

References 
 1955 Chicago White Sox at Baseball Reference
 

Chicago White Sox seasons
Chicago White Sox season
Chicago White